Mani may refer to:

Geography 
 Maní, Casanare, a town and municipality in Casanare Department, Colombia
 Mani, Chad, a town and sub-prefecture in Chad
 Mani, Evros, a village in northeastern Greece
 Mani, Karnataka, a village in Dakshina Kannada district of India
 Mani, Iran, a village in Kerman Province, Iran
 Mani, Nigeria, a town in Katsina State, Nigeria
 Mani, Tibet, a village in the Tibet Autonomous Region of China
 Maní, Yucatán, a small city in Yucatán, Mexico
East Mani, a municipality in the Laconia regional unit, Peloponnese, Greece
 El Mani, a community on the island of Puerto Rico
 Mani Peninsula, a geographical and cultural region in Greece
West Mani, a municipality in the Messenia regional unit, Peloponnese, Greece

People 
 Mani (name),, a given name and surname (including a list of people with the name)
Mani (prophet) (c. 216 – 274), an Iranian prophet
 Mani (musician) (born 1962), an English rock musician
 Mani (actor) (born 1975), Pakistani film and television actor and host
 Mani people, a Negrito ethnic group from Thailand

Arts, entertainment, and media
 Mani (web series), a 2017 Brat show
 Mâni, a form of Turkish folk song
 Mani: Travels in the Southern Peloponnese, a travelogue about the Greek peninsula by Patrick Leigh Fermor
 Mani (film), a 2003 Indian Kannada-language romance film

Other uses 
 Maní (Amazonian legend), a legend of the indigenous tribe Tupi in Brazil
 Máni, a personification of the moon in Norse mythology
 Mani, short for the mantra of Avalokiteśvara, Om mani padme hum
 Mani Jewel, any of various jewels mentioned in Buddhist literature
 Al-Māniʿ, one of the names of God in Islam, meaning "Withholder" and "Defender".
 Mani stick fighting, an African-derived martial art from Cuba
 Mani the parakeet, a rose-ringed parakeet that serves as an astrologer "assistant" to M. Muniyappan in Singapore
Manicure, abbreviated "mani"
 Mannosyl-oligosaccharide 1,2-alpha-mannosidase, an enzyme

See also 
Manes (disambiguation)
 Maniyy, a term for sexual fluids in Islamic jurisprudence